Ghirlanda is a village in Tuscany, central Italy, administratively a frazione of the comune of Massa Marittima, province of Grosseto, in the area of the Colline Metallifere. At the time of the 2001 census its population amounted to 173.

Ghirlanda is about 48 km from Grosseto and 2 km from Massa Marittima, and it is situated on the northern slopes of the hill of Massa.

Main sights 
 Ghirlanda train station, old station of Massa Marittima, northern terminal of the Follonica-Massa Marittima mining railway, it is now abandoned
 Mulino Badii, imposing mill of 19th century with Art Nouveau decorations
 Fountain of Bufalona, it is remembered for the rest that Giuseppe Garibaldi had here on 2 September 1849.

References

Bibliography 
 Aldo Mazzolai, Guida della Maremma. Percorsi tra arte e natura, Le Lettere, Florence, 1997.

See also 
 Montebamboli
 Niccioleta
 Prata, Massa Marittima
 Tatti, Massa Marittima
 Valpiana

Frazioni of Massa Marittima